2013 in Korea may refer to:
2013 in North Korea
2013 in South Korea